Odetta Sings Folk Songs is a studio album by American folk singer Odetta, released on the RCA Victor label in September 1963. The album peaked at number 75 on the Billboard Pop Albums charts.

Track listing
"900 Miles" – 3:10	 
"Blowin' in the Wind" (Bob Dylan) – 4:09	 
"Maybe She Go" – 1:54	 
"I Never Will Marry" – 1:55	 
"Yes I See" – 2:53	 
"Why'n Oh Why" – 2:05	 
"Shenandoah" – 3:46	 
"The Golden Vanity" – 4:02	 
"Roberta" – 3:07	 
"Anthem of the Rainbow" (Forrest Tollis, Robert Cosbey, Jr.) – 4:07	 
"All My Trials" – 3:32	 
"This Little Light of Mine" (Harry Loes) – 3:03

Personnel
Odetta – vocals, guitar
Bruce Langhorne – guitar
Victor Sproles – bass
Technical
Mickey Crofford – recording engineer

Production notes
Engineered by Mickey Crofford

1963 albums
Odetta albums
Albums produced by Hugo & Luigi
RCA Records albums